The Bulgarian Left (Bǎlgarskata levitsa, BL) is a democratic socialist political party in Bulgaria. It was created in February 2009 predominantly by members of the Bulgarian Socialist Party (BSP), with its constituent congress taking place on 4 April 2009. Its leaders are Hristofor Dochev, Ivan Genov, and Margarita Mileva.

A full member of the Party of the European Left (PEL) since September 2010, it is one of the few parties in the country to hold progressive views in regards to LGBT rights in Bulgaria. Alongside the BSP, the Democrats for a Strong Bulgaria, and the Green Movement, the BL was one of the few parties to have supported the parade organizers' right to hold the pride parade, and the only party, alongside the Greens, to have send statements of support to the parade.

In the 2013 Bulgarian parliamentary election, the BL won 5,924 votes (0.17%) and failed to win any seats. In the 2014 Bulgarian parliamentary election, the party participated in a coalition with the Green Party of Bulgaria; together, they won 7,010 votes (0.21%). This coalition continued during 2017 Bulgarian parliamentary election, in which they won 2,876 votes (0.08%).

Notes

References

External links 
 Official website

2009 establishments in Bulgaria
Democratic socialist parties in Europe
Party of the European Left member parties
Political parties established in 2009
Socialist parties in Bulgaria